Anduele Pryor (born 26 April 1985) is a Dutch footballer who plays as an attacking midfielder and is a free agent. He made his debut in professional football being part of the Vitesse squad in the 2006–07 season.

Career
After being released by the Bayern Munich reserves at the end of the 2011–12 season, Pryor trialled with SC Veendam in July 2012 and FC Emmen in January 2013.

References

External links
 

1985 births
Living people
Surinamese emigrants to the Netherlands
Sportspeople from Paramaribo
Dutch footballers
Footballers from Amsterdam
Association football midfielders
Eredivisie players
Challenger Pro League players
SBV Vitesse players
K.S.V. Roeselare players
FC Bayern Munich II players
Dutch expatriate footballers
Dutch expatriate sportspeople in Belgium
Expatriate footballers in Belgium
Dutch expatriate sportspeople in Germany
Expatriate footballers in Germany